Pello Bilbao López de Armentia (born 25 February 1990) is a Spanish cyclist, who currently rides for UCI WorldTeam .

Career

Caja Rural–Seguros RGA (2014–16)
Bilbao joined  for the 2014 season, after his previous team –  – folded at the end of the 2013 season. In 2015, Bilbao won the sixth stage of the Tour of Turkey, concluding his effort atop a steep climb.

Astana (2017–2019)
He was named in the start list for the 2017 Giro d'Italia. He finished 10th overall in the Tour de Suisse, which was his first top 10 in a general classification in a major stage race.

Bilbao finished 7th overall at the 2018 Volta a la Comunitat Valenciana. Months later he finished 8th overall at the Tour of the Basque Country. He won stage 1 of the Tour of the Alps, therefore riding stage 2 in the leader's jersey. He continued his great form at the Giro d'Italia, supporting Miguel Ángel López, and finishing 6th overall. Weeks later Bilbao won stage 6 of the Critérium du Dauphiné, which was his first World Tour victory.

In July 2019, he was named in the startlist for the Tour de France.

Bahrain–McLaren (2020–present)
He finished sixteenth at the 2020 Tour de France, before recording his best Grand Tour result to that point, placing fifth overall at the 2020 Giro d'Italia. He entered the 2021 Giro d'Italia as a domestique – initially for team leader Mikel Landa, before Landa had to withdraw from the race after a crash on the fifth stage. Damiano Caruso then took over as team leader, and following teamwork by Bilbao, won the penultimate stage of the race on his way to second overall; Bilbao ultimately finished 13th overall.

Bilbao finished on the overall podium at the 2022 UAE Tour, taking a third-place stage finish at Jebel Hafeet on the final day. At the Tour of the Basque Country, Bilbao won a small group sprint on the third stage into Amurrio; he ultimately finished the race in fifth overall. His next start was at the Tour of the Alps, where he again won a small group sprint, winning the second stage into Lana. Having finished second on the first stage, Bilbao assumed the race lead – which he would hold until the final day, when he lost forty seconds to three riders, who ultimately moved ahead of him in the general classification. At the Giro d'Italia, Bilbao finished in third place on the opening stage in Hungary, behind Mathieu van der Poel and Biniam Girmay. Bilbao held a top-ten position in the general classification for the duration of the race, ultimately finishing fifth overall, for the second time in three editions.

Major results

2011
 2nd Tour de Vendée
 7th Prueba Villafranca de Ordizia
2012
 10th Overall Vuelta a Asturias
2013
 7th Overall Vuelta a Asturias
2014
 1st Klasika Primavera
 3rd Circuito de Getxo
 6th Overall Vuelta a Burgos
 7th Overall Tour of Norway
 7th Overall Tour du Gévaudan Languedoc-Roussillon
 8th Grand Prix d'Ouverture La Marseillaise
2015
 1st  Overall Tour de Beauce
 1st  Mountains classification, Vuelta a Andalucía
 1st Stage 6 Tour of Turkey
 4th Overall Vuelta a Castilla y León
1st  Points classification
1st Stage 1
 7th Overall Tour du Gévaudan Languedoc-Roussillon
 10th GP Miguel Induráin
2016
 1st Stage 2 Presidential Tour of Turkey
 2nd Overall Vuelta a Castilla y León
 5th Circuito de Getxo
 6th GP Miguel Induráin
 7th Milano–Torino
 8th Klasika Primavera
 9th Overall Tour of Norway
 9th Prueba Villafranca de Ordizia
2017
 10th Overall Tour de Suisse
2018
 1st Stage 6 Critérium du Dauphiné
 1st Stage 1 Tour of the Alps
 6th Overall Giro d'Italia
 7th Overall Volta a la Comunitat Valenciana
 8th Overall Tour of the Basque Country
2019
 Giro d'Italia
1st Stages 7 & 20
 2nd Time trial, National Road Championships
 3rd Overall Vuelta a Murcia
1st Stage 1
 3rd Overall Volta a la Comunitat Valenciana
 4th Overall Vuelta a Andalucía
2020
 1st  Time trial, National Road Championships
 5th Overall Giro d'Italia
 6th Overall Vuelta a Andalucía
 6th Circuito de Getxo
2021
 2nd Overall Tour of the Alps
1st Stage 4
 4th GP Miguel Induráin
 5th Time trial, National Road Championships
 6th Overall Tour of the Basque Country
 9th Overall Tour de France
 10th Strade Bianche
2022
 2nd Overall Deutschland Tour
1st  Points classification
1st Stage 4
 3rd Overall Tour de Pologne
 3rd Overall UAE Tour
 4th Overall Tour of the Alps
1st Stage 2
 5th Overall Giro d'Italia
 5th Overall Tour of the Basque Country
1st Stage 3
 5th Strade Bianche
 9th Overall Tirreno–Adriatico
 9th Grand Prix Cycliste de Montréal
2023
 3rd Overall Tour Down Under
1st Stage 3
 4th Overall UAE Tour
 4th Overall Volta a la Comunitat Valenciana
 7th Strade Bianche

General classification results timeline

References

External links

 
 
 
 
 

1990 births
Cyclists from the Basque Country (autonomous community)
Living people
People from Guernica
Spanish Giro d'Italia stage winners
Sportspeople from Biscay
Spanish male cyclists